In enzymology, a hydroxypyruvate isomerase is an enzyme that catalyzes the chemical reaction

hydroxypyruvate  2-hydroxy-3-oxopropanoate

Hence, this enzyme has one substrate, hydroxypyruvate, and one product, 2-hydroxy-3-oxopropanoate.

This enzyme belongs to the family of isomerases, specifically those intramolecular oxidoreductases interconverting aldoses and ketoses.  The systematic name of this enzyme class is hydroxypyruvate aldose-ketose-isomerase. This enzyme participates in glyoxylate and dicarboxylate metabolism.

References

 

EC 5.3.1
Enzymes of unknown structure